The following is a list of telenovelas and television series produced by RCN Televisión.

1980s

1990s

2000s

2010s

2020s

See also 
 RCN Televisión

References 

RCN
 
RCN telenovelas and series